Clem Turner (May 28, 1945 – December 20, 2009) was a professional American football player who played running back for four seasons for the Cincinnati Bengals and Denver Broncos. He also wrestled professionally in the Midwest, most often in Indianapolis and Detroit, between 1972 and 1975. He died on December 20, 2009 in a car accident.

Turner was a running back at Woodward High School, and attended the University of Cincinnati, where he was also a running back. Turner played one season with the Hamilton Tiger-Cats of the Canadian Football League in 1967, the year they won the Grey Cup. In the 1969 NFL season, Turner played for the Cincinnati Bengals, and from 1970 to 1972, he played for the Denver Broncos. In 1973, the Buffalo Bills acquired him, where he failed the physical. He then went on to play in the World Football League for the Portland Storm and The Hawaiians.

In 1972, Turner started in professional wrestling during the football off-season, working in locations like Indianapolis and Detroit. Turner wrestled at least until 1975. 

Turner died in 2009 at the scene of a two-vehicle collision in Cincinnati. He was 64.

References

External links
Clem Turner at DatabaseFootball.com
Clem Turner, RB at NFL.com

1945 births
2009 deaths
American male professional wrestlers
American football running backs
Cincinnati Bengals players
Denver Broncos players
Cincinnati Bearcats football players
Hamilton Tiger-Cats players
Continental Football League players
The Hawaiians players
Portland Storm players
Players of American football from Cincinnati
Road incident deaths in Ohio
American Football League players
Woodward High School (Cincinnati, Ohio) alumni
20th-century professional wrestlers